Gol Gaz is a village in Nazil Rural District, Nukabad District, Khash County, Sistan and Baluchestan Province, Iran. At the 2006 census, its population was 32, in 11 families.

References 

Populated places in Khash County